Chalybeate Springs Hotel, also known as The Chalybeate, is a historic 19th and early-20th century resort hotel located at Bedford Township in Bedford County, Pennsylvania. It consists of the original two-story, three-bay Federal-style brick dwelling built about 1851.  In 1867, the front wing of the hotel was added.  It is a two-story, brick structure with front and rear porches and second story gallery porches.  The 'L'-shaped rear wing was added about 1885, and is a two-story brick structure with porches and second story gallery porches on both sides.  A separate ballroom building was built in 1903.  The hotel was in use until 1913.  In 1946, it was restored and refurbished.  It operated as a hotel until 1956, when it was converted to apartments.

It was listed on the National Register of Historic Places in 1985.

See also
 Historic preservation

References 

Hotel buildings on the National Register of Historic Places in Pennsylvania
Hotel buildings completed in 1851
Hotel buildings completed in 1867
Hotel buildings completed in 1885
Buildings and structures in Bedford County, Pennsylvania
1851 establishments in Pennsylvania
National Register of Historic Places in Bedford County, Pennsylvania